The 2019 CAA men's soccer tournament, was the 37th edition of the tournament. It determined the Colonial Athletic Association's automatic berth into the 2019 NCAA Division I men's soccer tournament. The tournament began November 8 and concluded on November 16.

James Madison, the defending champions, repeated as champions, defeating UNCW in the final.

Seeds

Bracket

Results

First round

Semifinals

Final

Awards

All Tournament XI 
The All Tournament XI was announced following the CAA Championship Game.

 Melker Anshelm, James Madison
 TJ Bush, James Madison
 Manuel Ferriol, James Madison
 Niclas Mohr, James Madison (Most Outstanding Player)
 Gabriel Cabral, UNCW
 Phillip Goodrum, UNCW
 Mark Lindstrom, UNCW
 Hendrik Hebbeker, Hofstra
 George O’Malley, Hofstra
 Alexander Levengood, William & Mary
 Julian Ngoh, William & Mary

References

External links 
 2019 CAA Men's Soccer Tournament

CAA Men's Soccer Tournament
CAA Men's Soccer Tournament
Caa Men's Soccer
Caa Men's Soccer